An urban heat island (UHI) is an urban area that is significantly warmer than its surrounding rural areas due to human activities. The temperature difference is usually larger at night than during the day, and is most apparent when winds are weak. UHI is most noticeable during the summer and winter. The main cause of the UHI effect is from the modification of land surfaces. A study has shown that heat islands can be affected by proximity to different types of land cover, so that proximity to barren land causes urban land to become hotter and proximity to vegetation makes it cooler. Waste heat generated by energy usage is a secondary contributor. As a population center grows, it tends to expand its area and increase its average temperature. The term heat island is also used; the term can be used to refer to any area that is relatively hotter than the surrounding, but generally refers to human-disturbed areas.

Monthly rainfall is greater downwind of cities, partially due to the UHI. Increases in heat within urban centers increases the length of growing seasons and decreases the occurrence of weak tornadoes. The UHI decreases air quality by increasing the production of pollutants such as ozone, and decreases water quality as warmer waters flow into area streams and put stress on their ecosystems.

Not all cities have a distinct urban heat island, and the heat island characteristics depend strongly on the background climate of the area in which the city is located. Effects within a city can vary significantly depending on local environmental conditions. Heat can be reduced by tree cover and green space, which act as sources of shade and promote evaporative cooling.
Other options include green roofs, passive daytime radiative cooling applications, and the use of lighter-colored surfaces and less absorptive building materials in urban areas, to reflect more sunlight and absorb less heat. 

Climate change is not the cause of urban heat islands but it is causing more frequent and more intense heat waves which in turn amplify the urban heat island effect in cities. Compact, dense urban development may increase the urban heat island effect, leading to higher temperatures and increased exposure.

Description

Definition 
A definition of urban heat island is: "The relative warmth of a city compared with surrounding rural areas." This relative warmth is caused by "heat trapping due to land use, the configuration and design of the built environment, including street layout and building size, the heat-absorbing properties of urban building materials, reduced ventilation, reduced greenery and water features, and domestic and industrial heat emissions generated directly from human activities".

Diurnal variability 

For most cities, the difference in temperature between the urban and surrounding rural area is largest at night. While temperature difference is significant all year round, the difference is generally bigger in winter. The typical temperature difference is several degrees between the city and surrounding areas. The difference in temperature between an inner city and its surrounding suburbs is frequently mentioned in weather reports, as in " downtown,  in the suburbs". The difference is larger for bigger cities and areas with a high air humidity.

Though the warmer air temperature within the UHI is generally most apparent at night, urban heat islands exhibit significant and somewhat paradoxical diurnal behavior. The air temperature difference between the UHI and the surrounding environment is large at night and small during the day. The opposite is true for skin temperatures of the urban landscape within the UHI.

Throughout the daytime, particularly when the skies are cloudless, urban surfaces are warmed by the absorption of solar radiation. Surfaces in the urban areas tend to warm faster than those of the surrounding rural areas. By virtue of their high heat capacities, urban surfaces act as a giant reservoir of heat energy. For example, concrete can hold roughly 2,000 times as much heat as an equivalent volume of air. As a result, the large daytime surface temperature within the UHI is easily seen via thermal remote sensing. As is often the case with daytime heating, this warming also has the effect of generating convective winds within the urban boundary layer. It is theorized that, due to the atmospheric mixing that results, the air temperature perturbation within the UHI is generally minimal or nonexistent during the day, though the surface temperatures can reach extremely high levels.

At night, the situation reverses. The absence of solar heating leads to the decrease of atmospheric convection and the stabilization of urban boundary layer. If enough stabilization occurs, an inversion layer is formed. This traps urban air near the surface, and keeping surface air warm from the still-warm urban surfaces, resulting in warmer nighttime air temperatures within the UHI. Other than the heat retention properties of urban areas, the nighttime maximum in urban canyons could also be due to the blocking of "sky view" during cooling: surfaces lose heat at night principally by radiation to the comparatively cool sky, and this is blocked by the buildings in an urban area. Radiative cooling is more dominant when wind speed is low and the sky is cloudless, and indeed the UHI is found to be largest at night in these conditions.

Seasonal variability 
The urban heat island temperature difference is not only usually larger at night than during the day, but also larger in winter than in summer. This is especially true in areas where snow is common, as cities tend to hold snow for shorter periods of time than surrounding rural areas (this is due to the higher insulation capacity of cities, as well as human activities such as plowing). This decreases the albedo of the city and thereby magnifies the heating effect. Higher wind speeds in rural areas, particularly in winter, can also function to make them cooler than urban areas. Regions with distinct wet and dry seasons will exhibit a larger urban heat island effect during the dry season.

Models and simulations 
If a city or town has a good system of taking weather observations the UHI can be measured directly. An alternative is to use a complex simulation of the location to calculate the UHI, or to use an approximate empirical method. Such models allow the UHI to be included in estimates of future temperatures rises within cities due to climate change.

Leonard O. Myrup published the first comprehensive numerical treatment to predict the effects of the urban heat island (UHI) in 1969. The heat island effect was found to be the net result of several competing physical processes. In general, reduced evaporation in the city center and the thermal properties of the city building and paving materials are the dominant parameters.

Causes 

There are several causes of an urban heat island (UHI); for example, dark surfaces absorb significantly more solar radiation, which causes urban concentrations of roads and buildings to heat more than suburban and rural areas during the day; materials commonly used in urban areas for pavement and roofs, such as concrete and asphalt, have significantly different thermal bulk properties (including heat capacity and thermal conductivity) and surface radiative properties (albedo and emissivity) than the surrounding rural areas. This causes a change in the energy budget of the urban area, often leading to higher temperatures than surrounding rural areas. 

Another major reason is the lack of evapotranspiration (for example, through lack of vegetation) in urban areas. The U.S. Forest Service found in 2018 that cities in the United States are losing 36 million trees each year. With a decreased amount of vegetation, cities also lose the shade and evaporative cooling effect of trees.

Other causes of a UHI are due to geometric effects. The tall buildings within many urban areas provide multiple surfaces for the reflection and absorption of sunlight, increasing the efficiency with which urban areas are heated. This is called the "urban canyon effect". Another effect of buildings is the blocking of wind, which also inhibits cooling by convection and prevents pollutants from dissipating. Waste heat from automobiles, air conditioning, industry, and other sources also contributes to the UHI.  

High levels of pollution in urban areas can also increase the UHI, as many forms of pollution change the radiative properties of the atmosphere. UHI not only raises urban temperatures but also increases ozone concentrations because ozone is a greenhouse gas whose formation will accelerate with the increase of temperature.

Climate change as an amplifier 

Climate change is not a cause but an amplifier of the urban heat island effect. The IPCC Sixth Assessment Report from 2022 summarized the available research accordingly: "Climate change increases heat stress risks in cities [...] and amplifies the urban heat island across Asian cities at 1.5°C and 2°C warming levels, both substantially larger than under present climates [...]." 

The report goes on to say: "In a warming world, increasing air temperature makes the urban heat island effect in cities worse. One key risk is heatwaves in cities that are likely to affect half of the future global urban population, with negative impacts on human health and economic productivity."

There are unhelpful interactions between heat and built infrastructure: These interactions increase the risk of heat stress for people living in cities.

Impacts

On weather and climate 
Aside from the effect on temperature, UHIs can produce secondary effects on local meteorology, including the altering of local wind patterns, the development of clouds and fog, the humidity, and the rates of precipitation. The extra heat provided by the UHI leads to greater upward motion, which can induce additional shower and thunderstorm activity. In addition, the UHI creates during the day a local low pressure area where relatively moist air from its rural surroundings converges, possibly leading to more favorable conditions for cloud formation. Rainfall rates downwind of cities are increased between 48% and 116%. Some cities show a total precipitation increase of 51%.

One study concluded that cities change the climate in area 2–4 times larger than their own area. One 1999 comparison between urban and rural areas proposed that urban heat island effects have little influence on global mean temperature trends. Others suggested that urban heat islands affect global climate by impacting the jet stream.

On human health 

UHIs have the potential to directly influence the health and welfare of urban residents. As UHIs are characterized by increased temperature, they can potentially increase the magnitude and duration of heat waves within cities. The number of individuals exposed to  extreme temperatures is increased by the UHI-induced warming. The nighttime effect of UHIs can be particularly harmful during a heat wave, as it deprives urban residents of the cool relief found in rural areas during the night.

Increased temperatures have been reported to cause heat illnesses, such as heat stroke, heat exhaustion, heat syncope, and heat cramps.  

High UHI intensity correlates with increased concentrations of air pollutants that gathered at night, which can affect the next day's air quality. These pollutants include volatile organic compounds, carbon monoxide, nitrogen oxides, and particulate matter. The production of these pollutants combined with the higher temperatures in UHIs can quicken the production of ozone. Ozone at surface level is considered to be a harmful pollutant. Studies suggest that increased temperatures in UHIs can increase polluted days but also note that other factors (e.g. air pressure, cloud cover, wind speed) can also have an effect on pollution. 

Studies from Hong Kong have found that areas of the city with poorer outdoor urban air ventilation tended to have stronger urban heat island effects and had significantly higher all-cause mortality compared to areas with better ventilation.

On water bodies and aquatic organisms 
UHIs also impair water quality. Hot pavement and rooftop surfaces transfer their excess heat to stormwater, which then drains into storm sewers and raises water temperatures as it is released into streams, rivers, ponds, and lakes. Additionally, increased urban water body temperatures lead to a decrease in diversity in the water. For example, in August 2001, rains over Cedar Rapids, Iowa, led to a 10.5C (18.9F) rise in the nearby stream within one hour, which led to a fish kill. Since the temperature of the rain was comparatively cool, it could be attributed to the hot pavement of the city. Similar events have been documented across the American Midwest, as well as Oregon and California. Rapid temperature changes can be stressful to aquatic ecosystems.  

With the temperature of the nearby buildings sometimes reaching an over  difference from the near-surface air temperature, precipitation will warm rapidly, causing run-off into nearby streams, lakes and rivers (or other bodies of water) to provide excessive thermal pollution. This increase will cause the fish species inhabiting the body of water to undergo thermal stress and shock due to the rapid change in temperature of their habitat.

Permeable pavements may reduce these effects by percolating water through the pavement into subsurface storage areas where it can be dissipated through absorption and evaporation.

On animals 
Species that are good at colonizing can utilize conditions provided by urban heat islands to thrive in regions outside of their normal range. Examples of this include the grey-headed flying fox (Pteropus poliocephalus) and the common house gecko (Hemidactylus frenatus). Grey-headed flying foxes, found in Melbourne, Australia, colonized urban habitats following the increase in temperatures there. Increased temperatures, causing warmer winter conditions, made the city more similar in climate to the more northerly wildland habitat of the species.

With temperate climates, urban heat islands will extend the growing season, therefore altering breeding strategies of inhabiting species. This can be best observed in the effects that urban heat islands have on water temperature (see effects on water bodies). 

Urban heat islands caused by cities have altered the natural selection process. Selective pressures like temporal variation in food, predation and water are relaxed causing a new set of selective forces to roll out. For example, within urban habitats, insects are more abundant than in rural areas. Insects are ectotherms. This means that they depend on the temperature of the environment to control their body temperature, making the warmer climates of the city perfect for their ability to thrive. A study done in Raleigh, North Carolina conducted on Parthenolecanium quercifex (oak scales), showed that this particular species preferred warmer climates and were therefore found in higher abundance in urban habitats than on oak trees in rural habitats. Over time spent living in urban habitats, they have adapted to thrive in warmer climates than in cooler ones.

On energy usage for cooling 
Another consequence of urban heat islands is the increased energy required for air conditioning and refrigeration in cities that are in comparatively hot climates. The heat island effect costs Los Angeles about US$100 million per year in energy (in the year 2000). Through the implementation of heat island reduction strategies, significant annual net energy savings have been calculated for northern locations such as Chicago, Salt Lake City, and Toronto.

Every year in the U.S. 15% of energy goes towards the air conditioning of buildings in these urban heat islands. It was reported in 1998 that "the air conditioning demand has risen 10% within the last 40 years." Home and business owners alike can benefit from building a cool community.

Options for reducing heat island effects 

Strategies to reduce excessive heat in cities include: Planting trees in cities, white roofs and light-coloured concrete, green infrastructure (including green roofs), passive daytime radiative cooling. 

Nearly 40 percent of that increase is due to the prevalence of dark roofs, with the remainder coming from dark-colored pavement and the declining presence of vegetation. The heat island effect can be counteracted slightly by using white or reflective materials to build houses, roofs, pavements, and roads, thus increasing the overall albedo of the city.

Planting trees in cities 

Planting trees around the city can be another way of increasing albedo and decreasing the urban heat island effect. It is recommended to plant deciduous trees because they can provide many benefits such as more shade in the summer and not blocking warmth in winter.

White roofs and light-coloured concrete 

Painting rooftops white has become a common strategy to reduce the heat island effect. In cities, there are many dark colored surfaces that absorb the heat of the sun in turn lowering the albedo of the city. White rooftops allow high solar reflectance and high solar emittance, increasing the albedo of the city or area the effect is occurring.

Relative to remedying the other sources of the problem, replacing dark roofing requires the least amount of investment for the most immediate return. A cool roof made from a reflective material such as vinyl reflects at least 75 percent of the sun's rays, and emit at least 70 percent of the solar radiation absorbed by the building envelope. Asphalt built-up roofs (BUR), by comparison, reflect 6 percent to 26 percent of solar radiation.

Using light-colored concrete has proven effective in reflecting up to 50% more light than asphalt and reducing ambient temperature. A low albedo value, characteristic of black asphalt, absorbs a large percentage of solar heat creating warmer near-surface temperatures. Paving with light-colored concrete, in addition to replacing asphalt with light-colored concrete, communities may be able to lower average temperatures. However, research into the interaction between reflective pavements and buildings has found that, unless the nearby buildings are fitted with reflective glass, solar radiation reflected off light-colored pavements can increase building temperatures, increasing air conditioning demands.

There are specific paint formulations for daytime radiative cooling that reflect up to 98.1% of sunlight.

Green infrastructure 

Another option is to increase the amount of well-watered vegetation. These two options can be combined with the implementation of green roofs. Green roofs are excellent insulators during the warm weather months and the plants cool the surrounding environment. Air quality is improved as the plants absorb carbon dioxide with concomitant production of oxygen. 

Green roofs decrease the urban heat island effect. Green roofery is the practice of having vegetation on a roof; such as having trees or a garden. The plants that are on the roof  increase the albedo and decreases the urban heat island effect. This method has been studied and criticized for the fact that green roofs are affected by climatic conditions, green roof variables are hard to measure, and are very complex systems.

The cost efficiency of green roofs is quite high because of several reasons. For one, green roofs have over double the lifespan of a conventional roof, effectively decelerating the amount of roof replacements every year. In addition to roof-life, green roofs add stormwater management reducing fees for utilities. The cost for green roofs is more in the beginning, but over a period of time, their efficiency provides financial as well as health benefits. However, "A conventional roof is estimated to be $83.78/m2 while a green roof was estimated at $158.82/m2."

Green parking lots use vegetation and surfaces other than asphalt to limit the urban heat island effect.

Passive daytime radiative cooling 

A passive daytime radiative cooling roof application can double the energy savings of a white roof, attributed to high solar reflectance and thermal emittance in the infrared window, with the highest cooling potential in hot and dry cities such as Phoenix and Las Vegas. When installed on roofs in dense urban areas, passive daytime radiative cooling panels can significantly lower outdoor surface temperatures at the pedestrian level.

Society and culture

History of research 
The phenomenon was first investigated and described by Luke Howard in the 1810s, although he was not the one to name the phenomenon.

Investigations of the urban atmosphere continued throughout the nineteenth century. Between the 1920s and the 1940s, researchers in the emerging field of local climatology or microscale meteorology in Europe, Mexico, India, Japan, and the United States pursued new methods to understand the phenomenon. 

In 1929, Albert Peppler used the term in a German publication believed to be the first instance of an equivalent to urban heat island:  (which is urban heat island in German). Between 1990 and 2000, about 30 studies were published annually; by 2010, that number had increased to 100, and by 2015, it was more than 300.

Leonard O. Myrup published the first comprehensive numerical treatment to predict the effects of the urban heat island (UHI) in 1969. His paper surveys UHI and criticizes then-existing theories as being excessively qualitative.

Aspects of social inequality 

Some studies suggest that the effects of UHIs on health may be disproportionate, since the impacts may be unevenly distributed based on a variety of factors such as age, ethnicity and socioeconomic status. This raises the possibility of health impacts from UHIs being an environmental justice issue.

There is a correlation between neighborhood income and tree canopy cover. Low-income neighborhoods tend to have significantly fewer trees than neighborhoods with higher incomes. Researchers hypothesized that less-well-off neighborhoods do not have the financial resources to plant and maintain trees. Affluent neighborhoods can afford more trees, on "both public and private property." Part of this is also that wealthier homeowners and communities can afford more land, which can be kept open as green space, whereas poorer ones are often rentals, where landowners try to maximize their profit by putting as much density as possible on their land.

Researchers have also noted that the spread of impervious surfaces is correlated with low socioeconomic status neighborhoods across various U.S. cities and states. The presence of these materials, which include concrete, tar and asphalt, serves as a predictor of "intra-urban variation in temperature".

Chief heat officers 
Beginning in the 2020s, a number of cities worldwide began creating Chief Heat Officer positions to organize and manage work counteracting the urban heat island effect.

Examples

United States 
Bill S.4280, introduced to the U.S. Senate in 2020, would authorize the National Integrated Heat Health Information System Interagency Committee (NIHHIS) to tackle extreme heat in the United States. Successful passage of this legislation would fund NIHHIS for five years and would instate a $100 million grant program within NIHHIS to encourage and fund urban heat reduction projects, including those using cools roofs and pavements and those improving HVAC systems. As of July 22, 2020 the bill has not moved past introduction to Congress.

The city of New York determined that the cooling potential per area was highest for street trees, followed by living roofs, light covered surface, and open space planting. From the standpoint of cost effectiveness, light surfaces, light roofs, and curbside planting have lower costs per temperature reduction.

Los Angeles 
A hypothetical "cool communities" program in Los Angeles has projected in 1997 that urban temperatures could be reduced by approximately  after planting ten million trees, reroofing five million homes, and painting one-quarter of the roads at an estimated cost of US$1 billion, giving estimated annual benefits of US$170 million from reduced air-conditioning costs and US$360 million in smog related health savings.

In a case study of the Los Angeles Basin in 1998, simulations showed that even when trees are not strategically placed in these urban heat islands, they can still aid in minimization of pollutants and energy reduction. It is estimated that with this wide-scale implementation, the city of Los Angeles can annually save $100M with most of the savings coming from cool roofs, lighter colored pavement, and the planting of trees. With a citywide implementation, added benefits from the lowering smog-level would result in at least one billion dollars of saving per year.

Los Angeles TreePeople, is an example of how tree planting can empower a community. Tree people provides the opportunity for people to come together, build capacity, community pride and the opportunity to collaborate and network with each other.

Athens green space initiative
Athens, the capital of Greece, has undertaken initiatives to reduce the urban heat island effect and reduce the impact of pollution from vehicles. To create green spaces that offer cooling, small unused plots of land are being reconfigured into pocket parks.

See also

 Urban climatology
 Urban reforestation
 Tropical night

References

External links

 Global Cool Cities Alliance
 Urban Heat Islands – introductory video by Science Museum of Virginia

Climatology
Climate forcing
Urbanization
Regional climate effects